The Revolutionary Tribunal was established during the French Revolution for the trial of political offenders.

The term revolutionary tribunal or revolutionary court may also refer to:
Islamic Revolutionary Court, Iran
Popular Revolutionary Tribunal,  (Burkina Faso)
Revolutionary tribunal (Russia)
Revolutionary tribunal (Hungary)
Revolutionary Tribunal (Egypt)
Revolutionary tribunal (Cuba)